Aretas I (Nabataean Aramaic: 
 Ḥārīṯat;  Arétās) is the first known King of the Nabataeans. His name appeared on the oldest Nabataean inscription dating from 168 BC which was found at Halutza. He is also mentioned in the deuterocanonical book 2 Maccabees (5:8). This book presents how Jason, the High Priest of Israel who founded a Greek quarter in Jerusalem, was held prisoner by Aretas I after being forced to leave Jerusalem.

See also
 List of rulers of Nabatea

References

Sources 
 Jewish Virtual Library

2nd-century BC Nabataean monarchs
2nd-century BC Arabs
2nd-century BC rulers in Asia